The Somaliland Fire Brigade (Somali: Ciidanka Dab-demiska Somaliland) It is a force for firefighting disasters, human safety and other national services related to the Somaliland Armed Forces, a new force throughout the Republic of Somaliland. National Fire Brigade was established in 2014, mainly composed of young crew and an emergency response agency.

Functions
The Somaliland National Fire brigade was set up to perform the following functions:
Extinguishing fires in their area.
protecting life and property in the event of fires in their area.
Rescuing and protecting people in the event of a road traffic collision and Rescuing and protecting people in the event of other emergencies.
Promoting fire safety through talks, advice and training sessions.
Inspecting building for fire safety and enforcing safety standards.
Performing practice drills.
Working with police and ambulance service personnel.

References

Fire departments
2014 establishments in Somaliland
Government agencies established in 2014